The 2014 CS Lombardia Trophy was a senior international figure skating competition held in September 2014 at the PalaSesto in Sesto San Giovanni, Italy. It was part of the 2014–15 ISU Challenger Series. Medals were awarded in the disciplines of men's singles, ladies' singles, and pair skating.

Results

Medal summary

Men

Ladies

Pairs

References

External links
 2014 CS Lombardia Trophy at the International Skating Union

Lombardia Trophy
CS Lombardia Trophy, 2014
Lombardia Trophy